The 2018–19 season was Chelsea's 105th competitive season, 30th consecutive season in the top flight of English football, 27th consecutive season in the Premier League, and 113th year in existence as a football club. The season covers the period from 1 July 2018 to 30 June 2019.

Kits

Management team

Players

New contracts

Transfers

In

Summer

Winter

Loan in

Summer

Winter

Out

Summer

Notes

Winter

Loan out

Summer

Winter

Overall transfer activity

Expenditure
Summer:  £125,650,000

Winter:  £64,620,000

Total:  £190,270,000

Income
Summer:  £53,640,000

Winter:  £15,440,000

Total:  £69,080,000

Net totals
Summer:  £72,010,000

Winter:  £49,180,000

Total:  £121,190,000

Friendlies

Friendlies

International Champions Cup

Tables

Matches

Competitions

Premier League

Tables

Results by matchday

Matches

FA Cup

EFL Cup

FA Community Shield

UEFA Europa League

Group stage
Tables

Matches

Knockout phase

Overview

August
Chelsea began the league campaign under new manager Sarri with a "comfortable" 3–0 victory at Huddersfield Town, with new midfielder Jorginho scoring a penalty on his debut, in between goals from N'Golo Kante and Pedro. This was followed by a home clash with Arsenal in the first home match of the season. After Pedro and Alvaro Morata quickly established a firm Chelsea advantage, Arsenal fought back to level before the break before Marcos Alonso won it late for the Blues.
Chelsea then made the long trip to Newcastle, and took the lead with fourteen minutes to play with an Eden Hazard penalty. With seven minutes to play, striker Joselu leveled it up, however Chelsea would have the last word, with a DeAndre Yedlin own goal with three minutes left seeing them edge it 2–1.

September
Chelsea began September by earning their fourth successive league win, courtesy of a 2–0 triumph over Bournemouth after goals from  Pedro and Hazard late on. This was followed by a clash with Cardiff City, but Chelsea were silenced after a surprise early goal from Sol Bamba; however two goals in six minutes from Hazard ensured Chelsea took a 2–1 lead, before he completed his hat-trick ten minutes from time. A Willian goal soon afterwards sealed a 4–1 win.
This was followed by a trip to Greek outfit PAOK Salonika in the opening group stage contest of that season's UEFA Europa League, with Chelsea playing in the competition for the first time since winning it in 2013. The Blues started off their campaign brightly, scoring after just seven minutes through Willian, but ultimately had to battle to a 1–0 win. However, Chelsea dropped their first points of the campaign against a West Ham team that had been winless at home thus far that season. drawing 0–0.
Chelsea followed the point at the London Stadium with a League Cup third-round success at Liverpool. After falling behind on 56 minutes through Daniel Sturridge, Chelsea struck back through Emerson and Hazard to claim a 2–1 win. They then faced a Reds side with a stronger team sheet at Stamford Bridge in the league, but were undone thanks to a late Sturridge stunner, and had to settle for a 1–1 draw. However, with Hazard having scored five league goals in the month, including the hat-trick against Cardiff, he was awarded with the Premier League Player of the Month for September 2018.

October 
October began with a narrow win over Hungarians MOL Vidi in the Europa League, with Morata scoring the game's only goal with twenty minutes to play. Chelsea then turned on the style in a 3–0 league win at Southampton, with Ross Barkley scoring his first of the season in between Hazard and Morata goals. Next up, Jose Mourinho – who had won three Premier League titles with Chelsea – made his return to Stamford Bridge as manager of Manchester United, who were eighth in the league and struggling. Chelsea took a 1–0 lead into half-time after a looping header from Antonio Rudiger, but a quickfire double from Anthony Martial in the second half put United in front; however, a 96th-minute equalizer from Ross Barkley kept Chelsea's unbeaten season intact.
Chelsea maintained their perfect Europa League record after a hat-trick for Ruben Loftus-Cheek helped them to a 3–1 win over Belarusian BATE Borisov, before the young English forward scored his first league goal of the season to cap off a "commanding" 4–0 destruction of Burnley at Turf Moor. Chelsea then battled to a 3–2 home win over Derby County in the League Cup last 16, with all five goals coming in an eventful first half, with Fikayo Tomori and Cesc Fabregas (along with a Richard Keogh own goal) on target for the Blues.

November 
Chelsea began November with a 3–1 home win over Crystal Palace, thanks largely to Morata's double. A nervy 1–0 win at BATE followed, with Olivier Giroud scoring his first goal under Maurizio Sarri, sealing a spot in the last 32 of the Europa League. Afterwards, Chelsea extended their unbeaten run of the campaign to eighteen matches after a goalless draw at home with Everton. However, their unbeaten record under Sarri was halted at that figure, with several defensive lapses seeing them fall to a 3–1 loss at Tottenham. Chelsea, however, recovered well by securing top spot in their Europa League group with a dominant 4–0 win over PAOK Salonika, with Giroud scoring twice and Callum Hudson-Odoi getting his first senior goal in a convincing display to cap off November.

December
Chelsea began December with a routine 2–0 home win over Fulham, thanks to goals from Pedro and Loftus-Cheek. before losing for just the second time that season, away to Wolves. After Ruben Loftus-Cheek gave Chelsea a first-half lead, the hosts struck back with second-half goals from Raul Jiminez and Diogo Jota to claim a 2–1 win. Chelsea were underdogs heading into a clash against a Manchester City team who had not lost domestically since April. However, despite being outplayed for large periods of the contest, a rocket-shot from Kante and a looping header from David Luiz sealed a memorable 2–0 win to ensure Chelsea's return to the top four. Chelsea then completed their Europa League group campaign with a 2–2 draw away to MOL Vidi. After going ahead through Willian, an Ethan Ampadu own goal and Loic Nego's sweet volley put the home side ahead, before a late leveller from Giroud sealed a point.
After first-half goals from Pedro and Hazard helped Chelsea battle past a resilient Brighton team, Maurizio Sarri's team set up a League Cup semi-final with London rivals Tottenham after scraping past Bournemouth 1–0 in the quarter-finals. However, this was followed by a frustrating home defeat to Leicester City, with the Foxes becoming the first team to win at Stamford Bridge all year thanks to Jamie Vardy's 51st-minute effort. After goals from either side in first-half stoppage-time, Eden Hazard's penalty won the day at Watford, before 2018 ended on a high for Chelsea after N'Golo Kante scored the only goal at Selhurst Park against Crystal Palace.

January
A disappointing goalless draw at home with Southampton was not the best way possible to start the new year, but Chelsea soon secured their first win of 2019 after beating Nottingham Forest 2–0 in the FA Cup third round. However, a 1–0 reverse to Tottenham in the first leg of the League Cup semi-final followed, before goals from Pedro and Willian earned a 2–1 victory over Newcastle United.
Chelsea (in fourth) had the gap to fifth closed to three points after Arsenal won 2–0 in a one-sided London derby, before beating Tottenham 4–2 on penalties after winning 2–1 in the second leg of the League Cup semi-final, to set up a final against holders Manchester City. They then strolled to a 3–0 win over Sheffield Wednesday in the FA Cup fourth round, before falling out of the top four after suffering a 4–0 league reverse at Bournemouth.

January Transfers
Chelsea only signed two players in January; the first was Juventus` Argentine forward Gonzalo Higuain, who arrived on loan for the remainder of the season, with an option to buy at the end. The second was young American prospect Christian Pulisic, who signed from Borussia Dortmund, though was sent back on loan to Germany for the remainder of the campaign. A host of players departed on loan, among them Alvaro Morata to Spaniards Atletico Madrid and Michy Batshuayi to Fenerbahce. Five players also departed permanently, most notably Cesc Fabregas, who joined French side AS Monaco.

February 
Chelsea returned to fourth after walloping Huddersfield Town 5–0 in the Premier League, with January signing Gonzalo Higuain scoring twice on his home debut. However, Chelsea's flaws were exposed after being beaten 6–0 at Manchester City, in their heaviest league defeat since 1992, when they lost 7–0 to Nottingham Forest.
After the City drubbing, Chelsea earned a 2–1 win away to Swedish outfit Malmo FF in the first leg of the Europa League last 32. An FA Cup exit to Manchester United was followed by the second leg, which Chelsea won 3–0 to secure passage to the last 16.
Chelsea then faced Manchester City in the League Cup final, and put in a solid defensive display to draw 0–0. In extra-time, however, manager Sarri attempted to call goalkeeper Kepa Arrizabalaga off, but the Spanish stopper refused to be substituted, and City went on to win 4–3 on penalties. Chelsea ended February with a critical home match against Tottenham in the league. After taking the lead through Pedro, Chelsea won 2–0 after a Kieran Trippier backpass rolled into his own net.

March
March began with Higuain scoring his first away goal for Chelsea in a narrow 2–1 success at Fulham, before goals from Pedro, Willian and Hudson-Odoi ensured a 3–0 first leg win over Dynamo Kyiv in the last 16 of the Europa League. A stoppage-time equalizer from Eden Hazard earned them a point against Wolves, before Olivier Giroud's first Chelsea hat-trick ensured a memorable 5–0 win away to Dynamo Kyiv, and an 8–0 aggregate victory.
A 2–0 league loss to Everton further dented Chelsea's Champions League qualification hopes, before March ended with a controversial win at Cardiff City, with Cesar Azpilicueta scoring from an offside position and Cardiff having at least "two good penalty shouts." waved away.

April
Chelsea maintained their 100% league record against Brighton with a 3–0 victory at Stamford Bridge that lifted them to fifth. Eden Hazard scored what would win the Premier League goal of the Month for April with a fantastic solo effort as the forward netted a brace in the 2–0 win over West Ham United. A late Marcos Alonso header earned Chelsea a 1–0 away win in the first leg of the Europa League quarter-finals against Czech Slavia Prague, before second-half goals from Sadio Mane and Mohamed Salah saw Chelsea lose 2–0 at Liverpool in the league. However, they followed this up with a thrilling 4–3 win against Slavia Prague in the return quarter-final leg of the Europa League, with Chelsea leading 4–1 after 27 minutes.
Chelsea then drew with Burnley 2–2, as Kante scored his first goal of 2019 and Higuain adding his fourth for the club. All four goals came in a thrilling opening 24 minutes, before April finished with Alonso cancelling out Juan Mata's opener in a 1–1 draw away with Manchester United.

May
May began with a tense 1–1 draw away to German Eintracht Frankfurt in the first leg of the Europa League semi-final, with Pedro lashing home an equalizer just before half-time. Chelsea then secured a top-four finish for the first time since 2017, after second-half goals from Ruben Loftus-Cheek, David Luiz and Gonzalo Higuain earned a 3–0 home win against Watford. Chelsea then faced Frankfurt in the second leg of the Europa League semi-final and, after taking the lead through Loftus-Cheek, were forced into extra-time after a second-half goal from Luka Jovic. Cesar Azpilicueta had a goal disallowed for a foul on goalie Trapp in the build-up, before Eden Hazard scored the winning penalty in the shootout to send Chelsea to meet Arsenal's 7–3 aggregate winners over Valencia in the final in Baku, Azerbaijan.
Chelsea's final day draw at Leicester secured a third-place league finish, with Chelsea having amassed 72 points from a possible 114. Chelsea collected one individual award for the league campaign, with Eden Hazards 15 assists enough to earn him the Premier League Playmaker Award for the most assists, whilst also collecting the Chelsea Player of the Year, Players` Player of the Year and Goal of the Year.
After a 3–0 win away to New England Revolution in a warm-up friendly, Chelsea faced Arsenal in the UEFA Europa League final. After a tense first half of few openings, Olivier Giroud nodded Chelsea in front on 49 minutes, and the team soon were ahead 2–0 after Pedro swept home on the hour mark. Hazard made it 3–0 from the spot before Alex Iwobi pulled on back for Arsenal; however, a second from Hazard sealed the game ensured a 4–1 win as Chelsea won the Europa League for the second time in their history.

Statistics

Appearances and goals

Top scorers

Top assists

Clean sheets

Discipline

Summary

Awards

References

Chelsea F.C. seasons
Chelsea
Chelsea
Chelsea
Chelsea
UEFA Europa League-winning seasons